Charaxes (Polyura) epigenes is a butterfly in the family Nymphalidae. It was described by Frederick DuCane Godman and Osbert Salvin in 1888. It is endemic to the Solomon Islands.

Subspecies
C. e. epigenes (Tulagi, Guadalcanal)
C. e. monochroma (Niepelt, 1914) (Bougainville, Shorthlan Island, Choiseul Island, Vella Lavella, Rendova, Santa Isabel)

References

External links
Polyura Billberg, 1820 at Markku Savela's Lepidoptera and Some Other Life Forms

Polyura
Butterflies described in 1888
Taxa named by Frederick DuCane Godman
Taxa named by Osbert Salvin